Ronald Reagan (1911–2004) was an American politician who served as president of the United States from 1981 to 1989. Many places both within and outside the United States have been named after Reagan.

The Ronald Reagan Legacy Project is an organization founded by Americans for Tax Reform, president Grover Norquist seeks to name at least one notable public landmark in each U.S. state and all 3067 counties after Reagan.

Ronald Reagan Boulevard in Warwick, New York built and dedicated in 1981 by real estate developer Frank J. Fazio was the first road to be named after Reagan. The first highway to be named after Reagan was Ronald Reagan Cross County Highway in Cincinnati.

Alabama 
 Ronald Reagan Memorial Highway (portion of Interstate 65 from Birmingham to Decatur)
 Ronald Reagan Spirit of America Field, Decatur (Reagan visited the field in 1984.)

American Samoa
 Ronald Reagan Shipyard in Pago Pago Harbor

Arizona 
 The Ronald Reagan Fundamental School, Yuma, Arizona
 Ronald Reagan Road, Kingman, Arizona

California

Institutions 
 The Ronald Reagan Presidential Library and Center for Public Affairs in Simi Valley
 Ronald Reagan California Republican Center, Burbank, California (headquarters of the California State Republican Party, renamed in 1996)
 Ronald Reagan Community Center, El Cajon, California (formerly the "El Cajon Community Center", and renamed in 2004)
 Ronald Reagan State Office Building, Los Angeles (renamed in 1990)
 The Ronald Reagan UCLA Medical Center, Los Angeles (dedicated in 2000 and opened in 2000)
 Ronald Reagan Federal Building and Courthouse in Santa Ana (renamed in 1999)
 Reagan Center, Los Angeles (associated with Childhelp USA)
 Reagan Ranch Leadership Academy, Santa Barbara (affiliated with the Young America's Foundation)
 Ronald Reagan Veteran Memorial Building, San Francisco, California (Headquarters of the American Legion Cathay Post #384, and renamed in 2006)

Schools 
 Ronald Reagan Elementary School, Bakersfield, California
 Ronald Reagan Elementary School,
Wildomar, California
 Ronald Reagan Elementary School in Chowchilla, California
 Ronald Reagan Park (educational site with a piece of the Berlin Wall), Verdemont, San Bernardino, California
 Ronald Reagan Sports Park, Temecula, California (formerly named "Rancho California Sports Park", renamed in 2005)
 Ronald Reagan Park, Diamond Bar, California

Roads 
 Ronald Reagan Freeway (State Route 118; previously named Simi Valley-San Fernando Valley Freeway, renamed in 1994)

Other 
 President Ronald Reagan Marine Corps League Detachment 597
 Ronald Reagan Day, day of recognition observed by some U.S. states on February 6
 Ronald Reagan Distinguished American Award, presented annually since 1991 by the Jonathan Club, Los Angeles
 Reagan Room at The Jonathan Club, Los Angeles
 The Ronald Reagan Penthouse at the Century Plaza Hotel in Los Angeles (The suite is the entire 30th floor of the hotel, and was one of his favorites.)
 A Golden Palm Star on the Palm Springs Walk of Stars, dedicated to him in 1997
 Ronald Reagan Federal Building and Courthouse in Santa Ana

Colorado
The Ronald Reagan Highway (Interstate 25 throughout El Paso County)

Florida
Florida's Turnpike designated the Ronald Reagan Turnpike, though the existing name was not changed.
Ronald Reagan Post Office Building, West Melbourne, Florida
Ronald W. Reagan Doral High School, a high school in the suburbs of Miami
Ronald Reagan Avenue, Miami, Florida renamed from its numerical name a major corridor in Miami.
Ronald Reagan Parkway, Hillsborough County, Florida
Ronald Reagan Boulevard, Seminole County Route 427 from Sanford to Maitland, which kept the existing number but had all street signs changed
Ronald Reagan Parkway, formerly Polk County County Road 54
A 25-mile section of State Road 9A in North Jacksonville was designated Ronald Reagan Highway

Georgia 
Ronald Reagan Drive in Evans, Columbia County
Ronald Reagan Parkway in Gwinnett County
Ronald Reagan Park in Five Forks
Ronald Reagan Boulevard in Cumming, Forsyth County

Idaho 
Ronald Reagan Elementary School, Nampa, Idaho

Illinois

Institutions 
 The Ronald W. Reagan Society at Eureka College, Eureka, Illinois, a national group of donors who support the living legacy of Ronald Reagan at his college alma mater.
 The Ronald and Nancy Reagan Research Center, Alzheimer's Association, Chicago
 Birthplace of Ronald Reagan (111 S. Main St. Tampico, now a museum)
 Ronald Reagan Boyhood Home National Historic Site (in Dixon, Illinois)
 Reagan Park, Tampico (named 1985, formerly Railroad Park)

Roads
 Ronald Reagan Highway (U.S. Highway 14)
 Ronald Reagan Memorial Tollway (Interstate 88)
 Ronald Reagan Trail
 Reagan Drive, Eureka, Illinois (named in 1979)
 Reagan Way, Dixon, Illinois (A portion of Hennepin Avenue where Reagan walked from his home to the swimming hole as a youth)

Schools
 Ronald W. Reagan Middle School in Dixon, formerly Madison School.
 Reagan Physical Education Center, Eureka College renamed in 1970 (previously named for Reagan and his brother Neil)
 Ronald Reagan Peace Garden, Eureka College (includes a piece of the Berlin Wall)
 Ronald W. Reagan Exhibit, Eureka College
 Ronald W. Reagan Leadership Program, Eureka College

Indiana
Ronald Reagan Expressway, (Interstate 469), Fort Wayne, Indiana
Ronald Reagan Corridor (Indiana), Hendricks County, Indiana
 Ronald Reagan Parkway (Indiana)

Kentucky
Ronald Reagan Highway (Interstate 275), Northern Kentucky, 2011

Louisiana
Ronald Reagan Highway (US 190)

Mississippi
The Reagan Hope Home

Missouri
Ronald Reagan Parkway, Lake St. Louis, Missouri
Ronald and Nancy Reagan Center, also known as The Gillioz Theater, a historic theater in Springfield, Missouri

Nebraska
Ronald W. Reagan Elementary School, Omaha, Nebraska

New Hampshire
Mount Reagan - (NH legislature changed name in 2003, but it conflicts with "Mount Clay", still recognized by the U.S. Board on Geographic Names)

New Jersey
Ronald Reagan School #30 - Elizabeth, New Jersey

New York
Ronald Reagan Boulevard - Warwick, New York Ronald Reagan Boulevard in Warwick, New York built and dedicated in 1981 by real estate developer Frank J. Fazio was the first road to be named after Reagan.
The House of President Ronald Reagan at The King's College, New York, New York

North Carolina
Ronald W. Reagan High School, Pfafftown, Forsyth County

North Dakota
Ronald Reagan Minuteman Missile State Historic Site, Cooperstown, North Dakota

Ohio
Ronald Reagan Cross County Highway (State Route 126 north of Cincinnati), named on March 17, 1993

Pennsylvania
Ronald Reagan Federal Building and Courthouse, in Harrisburg (named on March 9, 2004)
Ronald Reagan Drive, in the Philadelphia suburb of Richland Township (2002)
Ronald Reagan Drive, in the Pittsburgh suburb of McCandless Township (2006)

South Dakota
Reagan National University

Texas
Ronald Reagan Avenue, Hickory Creek, Texas
Ronald Reagan High School, San Antonio, Texas
Ronald Reagan Memorial Highway, Arlington, Texas
Ronald Reagan Middle School, Grand Prairie, Texas
Ronald Reagan Building, Harris County Department of Education, Houston, Texas
Ronald W Reagan Blvd. Leander, TX (Suburb of Austin)

Virginia
Ronald Reagan Washington National Airport (formerly Washington National Airport)
Ronald Reagan Washington National Airport Metro Station (formerly National Airport Metro Station) (On April 19, 2001 the WMATA Board voted to not rename the station.  However, subsequent Republican Party Congressional threats to withhold funding caused the renaming over the objection of local leaders and residents.)
Ronald Wilson Reagan Memorial Highway (State Route 234, dedicated to Reagan in 2005), Prince William County
The Reagan Building (Richmond City)
Ronald W. Reagan Middle School, Prince William County

Washington, D.C.
Ronald Reagan Building and International Trade Center, 1300 Pennsylvania Avenue NW
Ronald Reagan Chair in Public Policy at The Heritage Foundation
Ronald Reagan Institute of Emergency Medicine at George Washington University Hospital (the hospital to which Ronald Reagan was taken immediately after the March 30, 1981 assassination attempt on him and named after him on the tenth anniversary of the assassination attempt.)
The Ronald Wilson Reagan Republican Center of the National Republican Senatorial Committee
Statue of Ronald Reagan, a bronze sculpture by Chas Fagan in the rotunda of the U.S. Capitol

Wisconsin
 Ronald Wilson Reagan College Preparatory High School, Milwaukee

Statutes
Ronald Reagan Centennial Commission Act

Ships
USS Ronald Reagan (CVN-76), A nuclear-powered aircraft carrier – one of the few U.S. Navy ships that had been named after a living person

Outside the United States
Ronald Reagan statue in Grosvenor Square, London, United Kingdom. The statue includes a fragment of the Berlin Wall and a plaque with a quote from Tear down this wall!.
Ronald Reagan Ballistic Missile Defense Test Site, Marshall Islands, a United States missile range
Ronald Reagan Street, in Prague, Czech Republic
Ronald Reagan Bust statue, in Budapest City Park in 2006, Budapest, Hungary
Ronald Reagan bronze statue, in Liberty Square, Budapest, Hungary
Ronald Reagan Park, in Gdańsk, Poland
Ronald Reagan Square, formerly Central Square, in Kraków, Poland
The Ronald Reagan Statue, in Warsaw, Poland
Ronald Reagan Roundabout, in Wrocław, Poland
Ronald Reagan Monument, in Wrocław, Poland
Grenada Salutes Ronald Reagan, Leader of Freedom Commemorative Stamp Collection (proceeds to Ronald Reagan Scholarship Fund)
The Ronald Reagan Scholarship Fund, Grenada
Ronald Reagan bronze statue in the Rike Park, Tbilisi, Georgia
 Rondo Ronalda Reagana - in Szczecin, Poland
Ronald Raegan statue on Ronald Raegan alley in the South park of Sofia, Bulgaria
 Rondo Ronalda Reagana (Ronald Reagan Circle) Tarnow, Poland [2000]. Traffic circle that connects Pope John Paul II Street with a street leading to the Church of the Blessed Caroline.
 Ronald Reagan Street (Vulytsia Ronalda Reygana) in Kyiv, Ukraine (2022)

Proposals for things to be named for Reagan or feature his likeness
The $50 bill, or the dime
A large interstate bridge in Kentucky
U.S. Highway 14 in Wisconsin (already called "Ronald Reagan Highway" in Illinois)
Ronald Reagan's Birthday, (February 6)
Ronald Reagan Memorial Highway (New Jersey Route 15)
16th Street in Washington, DC
A street in Copenhagen, Denmark
A street in Chicago, Illinois
A park in Chicago, Illinois
Joachimstaler Platz in Berlin, Germany
The U.S. exclusive economic zone (EEZ)

See also
List of places named for George Washington
List of places named for Thomas Jefferson
List of places named for James Monroe
List of places named for Andrew Jackson
List of places named for James K. Polk
List of things named after George H. W. Bush
List of things named after Bill Clinton
List of things named after George W. Bush
List of things named after Barack Obama
List of things named after Donald Trump
List of educational institutions named after presidents of the United States
List of memorials to John F. Kennedy
Presidential memorials in the United States

References

External links

Ronald Reagan Presidential Library
Ronald Reagan Legacy Project, a non-profit organization devoted to honoring Reagan
List of honors named for Reagan from the Reagan Presidential Foundation & Library

Reagan
Ronald Reagan-related lists